Bruce Ijirighwo (born 6 November 1949) is a Nigerian sprinter. He competed in the men's 400 metres at the 1972 Summer Olympics.

References

1949 births
Living people
Athletes (track and field) at the 1972 Summer Olympics
Athletes (track and field) at the 1974 British Commonwealth Games
Nigerian male sprinters
Olympic athletes of Nigeria
Place of birth missing (living people)
Commonwealth Games competitors for Nigeria
20th-century Nigerian people